Benbrook Lake (also known as Benbrook Reservoir) is a reservoir on the Clear Fork of the Trinity River in Tarrant County, Texas, USA. The lake is located approximately 10 miles (16 km) southwest of the center of Fort Worth, where the Clear Fork and the West Fork of the Trinity River join. The lake is impounded by the Benbrook Dam. The lake and dam are owned and operated by the U.S. Army Corps of Engineers, Fort Worth District.

History 

Significant flooding on the Trinity River during May 1908, April 1922 and September 1936, was a primary cause for the development of Corps of Engineers flood control projects in North Texas.

Benbrook Dam and Lake were built by the Galveston District of the Corps of Engineers. During the decade of active civil works construction following World War II, the U.S. Congress provided for the construction of Benbrook Lake, Grapevine Lake, Lavon Lake and Ray Roberts Lake as well as modifications to the existing Garza Dam for the construction of Lewisville Lake. The River & Harbors Act of 1945 authorized these projects for the purposes of both flood control and navigation. These lakes and others, along with an extensive floodway system of levees, are operated in a coordinated manner to minimize flooding along the Trinity River floodplain corridor in the Dallas/Fort Worth Metroplex.

A second major influence for development was the desire of commercial interests for a shipping channel along the length of the Trinity River. Downstream it would connect to the Houston Ship Channel. Twenty-six separate lock and dam projects were to be constructed. Today a ship channel is maintained upriver as far as river mile 41 (km 66) near Liberty, Texas. Although unlikely, a navigation channel linking Fort Worth to the Gulf of Mexico could still be constructed.

Water originally intended for use in this navigation channel was only recently reallocated for municipal water use. The Tarrant Regional Water District in 1992 gained these water rights and now provides water supply to the cities of Benbrook, Fort Worth, and Weatherford. The Water District has also built pipelines that connect Benbrook Lake with the Fort Worth’s Rolling Hills water plant and both Cedar Creek and Richland-Chambers reservoirs southeast of Dallas.

Construction of Benbrook dam began in May 1947, and was practically completed when floodgates were closed and deliberate impoundment was begun in September 1952. The cost to build the lake was $14.5 million ($112 million in 2007 dollars). The rolled-earth embankment is 9,130 feet (2,783 m) in length, including the concrete spillway, and rises 130 feet (39.6 m) above the streambed to an elevation of 747 feet (227.7 m) above sea level. Two 30-inch-diameter pipes (0.76 m) are provided for low-flow releases to maintain downstream river flows.

This would increase to 7,630 acres (31 km²) if the lake ever reaches the nominal maximum flood pool elevation of 724, which is also the overall spillway elevation at the top of the center notch.

One design option considered during the planning stages for the lake included an alternate damsite near the current I-20 bridge over the Trinity River, 3.7 feet (1.1 m) downstream from the final, chosen location.

There was much more to construction than simply building the dam. Several railroads, roads and bridges, utility lines and cemeteries were relocated. The largest of these jobs was the rerouting of six miles (10 km) of the Gulf, Colorado and Santa Fe Railway. Gravesites from seven separate cemeteries were relocated to the Benbrook municipal cemetery at Winscott and Mercedes. No significant cultural, archeological or paleontological features existed in the project area, according to the July 1948 preconstruction survey.

Flooding and operational history 

Flooding in May 1949 claimed eleven lives in Fort Worth and cost $11 million to local businesses, as construction for the dam was beginning. During a spring 1957 flood, the new lake and the downtown floodway prevented $9.3 million in damages, almost recouping the original construction costs of the lake. During this flood, the lake filled to its  conservation level for the first time on May 12, 1957; the spillway elevation of 710 was reached on May 26 that year, with a record pool of 713.35 on June 6, 1957. This elevation was a record that lasted thirty-two years, but was then surpassed twice in an eleven-month period from June 1989 to May 1990. Flood damages prevented by Benbrook Lake from 1989 through 1991 have pushed the total savings for the life of the lake to over one billion dollars. This often requires closing of park roads and other facilities for extended periods.

Flooding History at Benbrook Lake 

The idea of a flood control reservoir like Benbrook Lake, is that floodwaters from heavy rains are retained above the dam. This reduces river flows downstream of the dam, and so prevents property damage and losses, but lake levels above the dam rise, and lands surrounding the lake are inundated. In other words, flooding is not eliminated, but its location is predetermined—it will be along the undeveloped lakeshore area upstream of the dam, rather than along the industrialized or populated downstream river valley.

Water releases from Benbrook Lake are made primarily through a  gated conduit at the southeast end of the dam. When waters rise too quickly to be released by this method, then the lake may flow over the uncontrolled spillway at the northwest end of the dam. As of 2005, there have only been five occasions on which the lake has been high enough for water to come over the spillway and through this notch. The lake has never been high enough to go over the entire width of the spillway, which is to be expected as the spillway was designed that this should happen only during a 100-year flood event.

1957 Flooding 

Spring rains in 1957 first filled the lake to its normal conservation pool elevation of 694 NGVD (National Geodetic Vertical Datum or feet above sea level) for the first time.

Releases through the spillway continued for almost a month, until June 21.

Benbrook Lake then did not reach the  spillway elevation again for over thirty-two years.

Flood events of 1989 and 1990 

The drought ended with heavy rainfall in the spring of 1989, and over the next 11 months the lake reached record high levels on two occasions. These record elevations— 716.6 on June 15 of 1989 and 717.5 in May 1990—were the first instances of spillway operation since that initial occurrence in 1957. These floods closed all the parks and recreation areas on Benbrook Lake for almost all of those two years, heavily damaging the facilities and shoreline, but saving hundreds of millions of dollars in Fort Worth downstream of the dam.

1991 Christmas flood 

See also 
 Trinity River Authority

References

External links 
 U.S. Army Corps of Engineers: Benbrook Lake
 U.S. Army Corps of Engineers: Corps Lake Gateway – Benbrook Lake
 Texas Parks and Wildlife: Benbrook Lake
 
 Recreation.gov: Benbrook Lake
 GORP: Benbrook Lake
 Leisure and Sport Review (LASR): Benbrook Lake

Reservoirs in Texas
Trinity River (Texas)
Bodies of water of Tarrant County, Texas
Dams in Texas
United States Army Corps of Engineers dams
Dams completed in 1952
Protected areas of Tarrant County, Texas